The Louisville and Interurban Railroad (L&I) was an interurban line that operated in and around Louisville, Kentucky during the first half of the 20th century.

The first line opened in 1901 to LaGrange. The next lines, one to Jeffersontown and the other to Prospect opened in 1904. Subsequent routes were built to Okolona (1905),  Orell (1907), and Fern Creek (1908). In 1911, L&I acquired the Louisville & Eastern Railroad. The L&E consisted of lines from Louisville to Shelbyville and La Grange. From 1931 to 1935, all routes were abandoned.

The L&I was owned by the Louisville Traction Company, which also operated local streetcar service through Louisville Railway Company.

References

External links
 Louisville Transit History
 Louisville & Interurban car at Dave's Electric Railroads

Interurban railways in Kentucky
Railway lines opened in 1904
Railway lines closed in 1935
Defunct Kentucky railroads
Transportation in Louisville, Kentucky
1904 establishments in Kentucky
1935 disestablishments in Kentucky
5 ft gauge railways in the United States